The 2014–15 Bowling Green Falcons men's basketball team represented Bowling Green State University during the 2014–15 NCAA Division I men's basketball season. The Falcons, led by first year head coach Chris Jans, played their home games at the Stroh Center as members of the East Division of the Mid-American Conference. They finished the season 21–12, 11–7 in MAC play to finish in third place in the East Division. They advanced to the second round of the MAC tournament where they lost to Eastern Michigan. They received an invitation to the CollegeInsider.com Tournament where they defeated Saint Francis (PA) in the first round before losing in the second round to Canisius.

Roster

Schedule

|-
!colspan=9 style="background:#F15C26; color:white;"|  Exhibition

|-
!colspan=9 style="background:#F15C26; color:white;"| Regular season

|-
!colspan=9 style="background:#F15C26; color:white;"| MAC tournament

|-
!colspan=9 style="background:#F15C26; color:white;"| CIT

References

Bowling Green
Bowling Green Falcons men's basketball seasons
Bowling Green